The Hall of Languages is a Syracuse University building designed by Horatio Nelson White in the Second Empire architectural style, and built in 1871–73. It was the first building constructed on the Syracuse University campus and the building originally housed the entire university.

The building's cornerstone was laid on August 31, 1871, by Jesse Truesdell Peck, and the building was dedicated on May 8, 1873, by Edmund S. James, then Bishop of the New York Conference. It is styled after the Gridley Building in Downtown Syracuse, which was also designed by the same architect. It features three large towers or cupolas and is made of Onondaga limestone and wood framing with interior cast-iron columns. The original building consisted of the east and west towers only; in 1886 the central tower was added. It was originally home to the College of Liberal Arts (now defunct), and subsequently the College of Arts and Sciences.

It was listed on the National Register of Historic Places in 1973. The interior was completely rebuilt in 1978–79.

The iconic building has been prominently displayed as a representation of the university in many forums. The building served as creative inspiration for the Addams Family home in the TV show. Most recently starting in 2010 the Syracuse Orange men's basketball team started wearing NIKE jerseys that feature an aerographic of the Hall of Languages.

Gallery

=See also
Archbold Gymnasium
Comstock Tract Buildings
Hendricks Chapel
Steele Hall
List of Registered Historic Places in Onondaga County, New York
Facadism
John Dustin Archbold

References

External links

"Hall of Languages," Syracuse University Archives

Hall of Languages
National Register of Historic Places in Syracuse, New York
University and college buildings on the National Register of Historic Places in New York (state)
Historic American Buildings Survey in New York (state)
Onondaga limestone
School buildings completed in 1873
1873 establishments in New York (state)